Jamal Shah (Pashto: جمال شاہ) is a Pakistani actor, director, musician, writer, sculptor, painter, and social activist.

Early life and education
Shah was born into a Pashtun Syed family in 1956 in Quetta, Balochistan, Pakistan. 

Shah received a Master's degree in English literature from the University of Balochistan in 1978. He graduated from the National College of Arts in Lahore in 1983. He later obtained a Master's degree in fine arts from the Slade School of Fine Art in London, United Kingdom.

Career 
In 1984, Shah established the Fine Arts Department at the University of Balochistan and headed it until 1986. In 1985, he founded the Artists Association of Balochistan and also was appointed the first Chairman of the Artist Association of Pakistan.

During the 1980s he began to have an international recognition, being called "the next Omar Sharif" and getting a role in the 1989 BBC television serial Traffik, but he refused most of these offers as they clashed with his Islamic values.

In 1991, Shah made his acting debut in the film K2, directed by Franc Roddam, and since then, he has appeared in many other movies and TV dramas.

He founded the Hunerkada College of Visual and Performing Arts in Islamabad in 1992 and later became a Telenor Pakistan brand ambassador doing television productions under the banner of Hunerkada Productions.

In 2007, Shah became the executive director of Pakistan National Council of the Arts (PNCA) in Islamabad, Pakistan, and then was appointed its Director General in October 2016. His tenure at PNCA ended on 22 September 2019 with him stating in an interview with Alyan Khan that he "did not want any extension". In 2019, Shah was the President and Chief Curator of the first Islamabad Art Festival.

Shah made his directorial debut with the 2016 film Revenge of the Worthless.

In 2021, Shah was awarded the Ordre des Arts et des Lettres from the French Minister of Culture.

In 2022, he sculpted a bronze bust of Pakistani Nobel laureate Dr Abdus Salam, which was unveiled by the director general of International Atomic Energy Agency, Yukiya Amano at IAEA's 61st general conference.

Filmography

Television

See also 
 Pakistan National Council of the Arts
 Artist Association of Pakistan
 Hunerkada College of Visual and Performing Arts
 Traffik
 List of Lollywood actors

References

External links
 
 
 
 

Pashtun people
People from Quetta
1956 births
Living people
Pakistani male film actors
Pakistani male television actors
Pakistani painters
University of Balochistan alumni
Academic staff of the University of Balochistan
National College of Arts alumni
Alumni of the Slade School of Fine Art